Lyndon School may refer to:

Lyndon School, Solihull, West Midlands, UK

See also
 Lynden High School, Lynden, Washington
 Lyndon Academy, Woodstock, Georgia
 Lyndon Institute, Lyndon, Vermont
 Lyndon State College, Lyndon, Vermont
 LBJ School (disambiguation)
 Linden School (disambiguation)
 Lyndon (disambiguation)
 Lyndon B. Johnson High School (disambiguation)